Yangsze Choo is a Malaysian writer of Chinese descent, whose novel The Night Tiger was selected as one of 70 works in the Big Jubilee Read, a campaign to celebrate the Platinum Jubilee of Elizabeth II.

Biography 
Choo was born in the Philippines, to a Malaysian family of Chinese descent. Her father was a diplomat and the family moved frequently, so she spent her formative years in Thailand, Germany, Japan and Singapore. She attended Harvard University and subsequently worked as a management consultant. She began to write after leaving management consultancy to focus on her family, often writing at night.

Her first novel The Ghost Bride took three years to write. It is a fantasy novel, based on the practice of ghost marriage and drawing on Chinese mythology to create its world. It became a New York Times best-seller, and was selected as a Best Book by Oprah.com. It later formed the basis of the Netflix-original series The Ghost Bride, which was co-directed by Malaysian directors Quek Shio-chuan and Ho Yu-hang. It starred Huang Pei-jia, Wu Kang-jen, Ludi Lin, and Kuang Tian.

Her second novel, The Night Tiger took four years to write. It is set in 1931 in Malaya, then part of the British Empire, and addresses the Malaysian myth of the weretiger. It was selected as one of 70 works in the Big Jubilee Read, a campaign to celebrate the Platinum Jubilee of Elizabeth II.

Novels 

 The Ghost Bride (William Morrow & Co., 2013)
 The Night Tiger (Quercus, 2019)

Reception 
The Ghost Bride was described by the New York Journal of Books as suitable for readers who want "to learn about cultural tradition or who have tired of either vampire or zombie genre". Critical theorist Anita Harris Satkunananthan, through her analysis of the work coined the term "Malaysian Chinese Domestic Gothic" to describe the text.

Patricia Schultheis, writing in the Washington Independent Review of Books, described The Night Tiger as a "darn good yarn" that is "free of political polemics and post-colonial self-righteousness".

Personal life 
Choo lives in California, with her husband and children, and keeps chickens.

References

External links 

 Official website
 10 Questions With Yangsze Choo, Author of ‘The Night Tiger’

Living people
Year of birth missing (living people)
Malaysian people of Chinese descent
Malaysian women novelists
Fantasy writers
Harvard University alumni
21st-century Malaysian women writers
Malaysian emigrants to the United States